Respect Fighting Championship (RESPECT.FC) is a mixed martial arts organization in Germany. It has won the GNP Award for the best German promotion in 2009, 2010 and 2011 Especially noteworthy in this context is that RESPECT.FC has beaten the Ultimate Fighting Championship (the biggest mixed martial arts organization in the world), who was nominated with their first German based event UFC 99. The events are broadcast by Fightcast.tv.

History

Partnership with Battle of the South (Netherlands)
On April 2, 2011, a 'RESPECT.FC Title Contender Fight' between Ben Boekee and Denis Oliwka took place at "Battle of the South", one of the biggest MMA Events in the Netherlands. That was the first and only co-promotion for RESPECT.FC so far.

Rules
RESPECT.FC's rules differ somewhat from the North American Unified Rules. Among the differences are the allowance of knees to the head of downed opponent and stomp kicks to the body, while elbows to the head of downed opponent and soccer kicks are prohibited. Similar to the Unified Rules, fights have 3 rounds each lasting 5 minutes. Title Fights are 5 rounds.

Current champions

Championship history

Heavyweight Championship

Cruiserweight Championship

Middleweight Championship

Welterweight Championship

Lightweight Championship

Featherweight Championship

Notable fighters 
  Björn Schmiedeberg - #1 ranked German HW fighter, RESPECT.FC Heavyweight Champion
  Ben Boekee - WFCA Dutch Featherweight Champion, RESPECT.FC Featherweight Champion
  Cengiz Dana - M-1 Global, KSW and Cage Warriors veteran, RESPECT.FC Lightweight Champion
  Sascha Weinpolter - #1 ranked Austrian HW fighter, Austria MMA Heavyweight Champion
  Andreas Kraniotakes - #3 ranked German HW fighter, Cage Warriors veteran, appears as a character in EA Sports MMA video game
  Danny Hoyer - IKF Sanshou Super-Welterweight World Champion
  Janosch Stefan - 2nd Place Combat Sambo World Championships 2008
  Nordin Asrih - TUF Season 13 contestant and M-1 Global veteran
  Alexandra Sanchez - Jewels Rough Stone Grand Prix 2009 Champion
  Raymond Jarman - M-1 Global & Shooto veteran
  Nick Hein - European Judo Champion 2006
  Jesse-Björn Buckler - Cage Warriors and SLAMM!! Events veteran

Events

References

External links
 RESPECT.FC event results on Sherdog

Organizations established in 2009
2009 establishments in Germany
Mixed martial arts organizations
Mixed martial arts in Germany
Companies based in Essen